Dis-Chem is the second largest retail pharmacy chain in South Africa, with 165 stores, plus 4 in Namibia and 1 in Botswana. The chain had a total revenue of 21.4 billion South African rand in 2019. Dis-Chem has private label products, sells via the Internet, operates a loyalty programme, and the Group has a wholesale division. The chain announced in 2016 its plans to double the number of outlets through 2021. At that time, one-third of its outlets were less than three years old.

History
Dis-Chem started in 1978 when pharmacists Ivan and Lynette Saltzman, opened their first retail pharmacy in Mondeor, a southern suburb of Johannesburg. They introduced the concept of a discount pharmacy with product categories that until then, had not been offered in South African pharmacies because of prohibiting legislation.

In 2014, Dis-Chem opened its first store outside South Africa, in Windhoek, Namibia.
In November 2016, Dis-Chem Pharmacies Limited group listed 27.5% of its listed share capital on the Johannesburg Stock Exchange. It was the second-largest IPO in the exchange's history.

Criticism
In July 2020, the Competition Commission of South Africa found Dis-Chem guilty of inflating prices of certain hygiene products (i.e. disposable face masks) during the COVID-19 pandemic.

In September 2022, Dischem CEO, Ivan Saltzman issued a memo, according to the letter, the company placed a moratorium on the appointment of white individuals.

References

Pharmacy brands
Retail companies of South Africa
Companies based in Johannesburg